Luis Peraza Rios (June 17, 1942 – May 3, 2011) was a Major League Baseball pitcher.

Peraza's professional baseball career began in 1961 in the New York Yankees' organization, then it was interrupted for two seasons (1962–1963). In 1964, Peraza was signed by the Los Angeles Angels' system, pitching at the Class A level for all of 1964 through two games during 1965. Then he was out of pro ball until he was signed by the Phillies in 1967.

His eight-game MLB trial in 1969 consisted of nine total innings pitched. Peraza allowed 12 hits, six earned runs and two bases on balls, with seven strikeouts. He did not record a decision or a save.

References

External links

1942 births
2011 deaths
Bakersfield Bears players
Eugene Emeralds players
Harlan Smokies players
Major League Baseball pitchers
Major League Baseball players from Puerto Rico
People from Río Piedras, Puerto Rico
Philadelphia Phillies players
Reading Phillies players
San Jose Bees players